Pentila fidonioides is a butterfly in the family Lycaenidae. It is found in southern Cameroon.

References

Butterflies described in 1923
Poritiinae
Endemic fauna of Cameroon
Butterflies of Africa